iStreet Giving was an online shopping platform set-up to help UK charities raise additional funds through online shopping. The firm's headquarters are located in Ipswich, Suffolk.



History 
In 2014, Hugo Catchpole and Hamish Stone founded iStreet, an online platform which helps shoppers to help a good cause with online shopping. The Social Enterprise allows users to donate to charities and good causes alike registered with the site, by their day to day online shopping.

How it Works 
It is free for UK charities and good causes to register themselves on iStreet, in doing so a profile is automatically created - this profile connects the charity with over 1200 retailers. Charities can then share their iStreet page with their supporters allowing them to raise donations whilst online shopping. Users raise a small donation on every shop, this is normally a percentage of the total spend - at no extra cost, providing an alternative mode of fundraising.

Accolades 
In 2014, iStreet was recognised in the Charity Times annual Awards in their Fundraising Technology category - finishing runner up. The prestigious Charity Times awards are said to be a pre-eminent celebration of best practise in the UK charity and not-for-profit sector, recognising outstanding achievement and operational excellence. The Big Give Christmas Challenge scooped the award for their ongoing success.

Comparable organisations utilising technology in aid of fundraising 
Justgiving 
Virgin Money Giving 
The Big Give 
Bmycharity
Localgiving.com

References

External links 
 
 Age UK Suffolk
 The Future Project
 Retired Greyhound Trust
 Woodbridge Tide Mill

British fundraising websites
British companies established in 2014
Companies based in Suffolk
Charity fundraisers
2014 establishments in the United Kingdom